The following is a list of Jewish Autonomous Oblast leaders:

Jewish leadership in the 21st Century

Jews have historically played a role in the Jewish Autonomous Oblast's Jewish community, historical narrative and government.  In 2004 Chief Rabbi of Russia Berel Lazar took part in the 70th anniversary celebration for the Jewish Autonomous Oblast. Rabbi Lazar and Avraham Berkowitz, the Executive Director of the Federation of Jewish Communities of the CIS, led a delegation to Birobidzhan for the event. Local Jewish Community leaders; Mayor Alexander Vinnikov, Lev Toitman and Valery Solomonovich Gurevich also participated in the opening of the Birobidzhan Synagogue, which marked the 70th anniversary of the region.   Rabbi Mordechai Scheiner, the Chief Rabbi of Birobidzhan and Chabad Lubavitch representative to the region, said "Today one can enjoy the benefits of the Yiddish culture and not be afraid to return to their Jewish traditions. Its safe without any Anti-Semitism and we plan to open the first Jewish day school here".  Concerning the Jewish Community of the oblast, Governor Nikolay Mikhaylovich Volkov has stated that he intends to, "support every valuable initiative maintained by our local Jewish organizations."

Jewish leaders of the JAO

Alexander Vinnikov - mayor of Birobizhan
Valery Solomonovich Gurevich - Vice-Chairman of the JAO
Lev Toitman - Chairman for Birobidzhan's 4,500 member Jewish Community (Federation of Jewish Communities of the CIS)
Mordechai Scheiner - Chief Rabbi of JAO
Boris "Dov" Kaufman - leader of Beit T'shuva

Non-Jewish leaders of the JAO

Nikolay Mikhaylovich Volkov - Governor of JAO
Viktor Gozhy - First Vice-Chairman of the JAO

See also

Administrative divisions of the Jewish Autonomous Oblast
Tongjiang-Nizhneleninskoye railway bridge
Birobidzhan Jewish National University
Birobidzhaner Shtern
David Bergelson
Jews and Judaism in the Jewish Autonomous Oblast
Mikhail Kalinin
Semyon Dimanstein

Jewish Autonomous Oblast
Jews and Judaism in the Soviet Union
Yiddish culture in Russia